Elodie Lesaffre (born 23 September 1979) is a French sailor. She competed in the Yngling event at the 2004 Summer Olympics.

References

External links
 

1979 births
Living people
French female sailors (sport)
Olympic sailors of France
Sailors at the 2004 Summer Olympics – Yngling
Sportspeople from Nantes